Kim Gyeong-suk (born 1 August 1967) is a South Korean former cyclist. She competed in the women's individual road race at the 1988 Summer Olympics.

She also won the gold medal at the 1986 Asian Games in Seoul.

References

1967 births
Living people
South Korean female cyclists
Olympic cyclists of South Korea
Cyclists at the 1988 Summer Olympics
Place of birth missing (living people)
Asian Games medalists in cycling
Cyclists at the 1986 Asian Games
Medalists at the 1986 Asian Games
Asian Games gold medalists for South Korea
20th-century South Korean women
21st-century South Korean women